Moustafa Amar (born 22 September 1966) is an Egyptian musician and actor.

Career 
Amar's first song was "Wala Yabou Khad Gameel", released on a collective album. In 1990, he released his first solo album, Wassaf. In 1992–1993, he released a second album, Layaleki, which sold well. He has collaborated with actress Nilly ("Papa Noel"), and in 1993 he released his 3rd album skeet el 3ash2een. 
In 1994, album Eftekerny. In 1995, album Leman Yahomho El Samr (Salimonee). In 1996, album Taal El Lail. In 1997, album Nar Al Hob. In 1999, El Leila Doub. In 2000, Aysheen. In 2001, Habeeb Hayati. In 2002, Monaya. In 2003, Rohi Feek. In 2003, Bahebak O Ana Kaman. In 2004, Ensa. In 2007, Leesa Habayeb. In 2010, Heya. In 2014, Ana Metamen.

In addition to writing his own music, he has composed for other Arabic singers, including Ehab Tawfik and Ali El Haggar.

Movies: El Battal (1998) El Hob Al Awal (2000) Ashab Wala Business (2001) Elb Gareh (2002) Bahabek Ana Kanan (2003) Nar Al Hobeen (2004) Hareem Kareem (2005) Esyabet Al Doctor Omar (2007) Mafeesh Fayda (2008) Gowa El Lohba (2012)

Discography 
 Wassaf (1990)
 Eftekerney (1992)
 Layaliki (1993)
 Seket Al-Ashe'en (1994)

Aisheen (with Gipsy Kings) (2000)
 Hayaty (2001)
 Monaya (2002)
 Rohy Feek (2003)
 Bahebak Wana Kaman (2003)
 Enssa (2004)
 Lessa Habayeb (2006)
 Heya (2010)
 Mawlaya Sobhanak (2013)
 ِAna Metamen (2014)
 dehket lya (2019)

Singles 

 Ghazali (ft Hamid El Shari) (2000)
 Sotak mosh kefaya (ft Sherine wagdy) (2006)
 Aisheen (with Gipsy Kings) (2000)
 Habib Hayati (2001)
 Sotak mosh kefaya (ft. Sherine Wagdy) (2006)
 Mareed Bel-Hob (2008)
 Aywa Enta (2008)
 De7ket 2alet (2009)
 Hatganen (2011)
  new arrangement (2013)

Filmography 
 Al Batal (1997)
 Al Hob Al Awal (2000)
 As'hab Walla Business (2001)
 Alb Garee (2002)
 Bahebbak Wana Kaman (2003)
 Hobbak Nar (2004)
 Hareem Kareem (2005) 
 Esabet Al-Doctor Omar (2007)
 Mafeesh Faida (2008)
 Gowa El Le'ba (2012)
 Fen Alby(2017)

TV series 
 Ali Ya Weka (2007)
 Montaha elaeshaa (2010) 
 Essam w elmesba7 Part II (Vocal Performance) (2012)

FM series 
 maesr Italya wbl2ks (2003)
 bahebk Ya Magnona (2006)
 Fares men elzaman elgadid (2011)

References

External links 
 
 
 

1966 births
Living people
Egyptian male film actors
People from Alexandria
20th-century Egyptian male singers
Egyptian singer-songwriters
Egyptian Muslims
Egyptian male television actors
Singers who perform in Classical Arabic
Singers who perform in Egyptian Arabic
21st-century Egyptian male singers